Gresham is an unincorporated community in Marion County, South Carolina, United States. Gresham has a post office with ZIP code 29546, which opened on May 26, 1880.

References

Unincorporated communities in Marion County, South Carolina
Unincorporated communities in South Carolina